The Ronde van Brabant was a men's cycling race organized for the last time in 1971. The race was run in Lubbeek in the Belgian Province of Brabant.

The competition's roll of honor includes the success of Rik Van Looy.

Winners

References 

Cycle races in Belgium
Defunct cycling races in Belgium
1952 establishments in Belgium
Recurring sporting events established in 1952
Recurring sporting events disestablished in 1971